GKS Katowice (GKS stands for , "Miners Sporting Club") is a Polish football club based in Katowice, Poland. The club currently plays in the I liga, after having won promotion in 2021.

History

In 1963 in Katowice a special organizational committee was called with the purpose of uniting all the clubs and sporting organizations of the city into one large club which would encompass many disciplines. In mid-1963 Rapid Welnowiec and Orzeł Welnowiec merged, creating Rapid/Orzeł. In 1964 Rapid/Orzeł, Górnik Katowice, Koszutka Katowice, Katowicki Klub Łyżwiarski (Katowice Skating Club), Katowicki Klub Sportowy Górnik, Górniczy Klub Żeglarski Szkwał (a sailing club) amongst other clubs from Katowice merged creating GKS Katowice. Four years later on the 9 August 1968, Dąb Katowice also amalgamated with GKS Katowice. GKS Katowice made its debut in Polish football's top league (now call the Ekstraklasa) on 8 August 1965 when GKS Katowice took on local rivals Górnik Zabrze.

GKS Katowice's debut season in the top flight was in the season of 1965–66. The new team quickly gained experience and ability. A bad patch for the club came in 1971 when Katowice was relegated to the 2nd Division. The club's problems were quickly overcome, and GKS returned to the top flight where they played with pride and passion. From 1982 the club consistently found itself up the top end of the ladder, as well as playing off in several Polish Cup finals. In 1985 GKS Katowice played in its first Polish Cup final but lost in a penalty shootout to Widzew Łódź. The following year GKS played off in a memorable final at Stadion Śląski against Górnik Zabrze; GKS triumphed 4–1. From that moment the city of Katowice began to live and breathe football. The next year GKS finished third and the two following years they were runners-up. In 1989 GKS again came third, and in 1991 GKS were runners-up. From 1986 to 1995 to GKS Katowice were four times runners-up in the league, twice the winners of the Polish Supercup and three-time Polish Cup winners.

The biggest moments for the club and fans were always when the team took part in European cups. The first time GKS faced European opposition was in 1970, in the now defunct Inter-Cities Fairs Cup, GKS took on the might of Barcelona in a two-legged tie. Katowice didn't lose by much (2-4 on aggregate), the fans were proud of their club. The second time GKS took part in European football they showed more and played better football. In the first round of the 1986–1987 UEFA Cup Winners Cup GKS defeated Iceland's Fram Reykjavík but in the second round, they lost to Switzerland's Sion. For the next 10 years, GKS Katowice took part in European football. Over the years fans of GKS got to witness their team take on the likes of Sportul Studentsc Bucharest, Rangers, Club Brugge, Galatasaray, Benfica, Aris, Girondins Bordeaux and twice Bayer Leverkusen. GKS's record in European football stands at 10 wins, 7 draws, and 19 losses.

GKS Katowice again fell on hard times during the mining crisis. In 1999 the team was relegated from the Ekstraklasa, but was back in the topflight only a year later. Piotr Dziurowicz became president who, despite growing debts and financial troubles, kept the team in the top flight. In 2003 the team even managed to qualify for the UEFA Cup by finishing third in the league under coach Jan Żurek. This was hailed as one of the biggest surprises ever in the history of the Ekstraklasa. Despite the success, the debts under Piotr Dziurowicz began to grow to a significant sum.

From March 27, 2003 to June 11, 2004, the club played under the name of its main sponsor Dospel Katowice; this was not taken well by the fans of the club. GKS Katowice Sportowa Spółka Akcyjna finished its reins at the helm of the club in the summer of 2005 after the disastrous 2004–2005 season where GKS finished 14th (and last) in the Ekstraklasa and was relegated to the second Division. Then to make matters worse the team had to drop to the 4th Division due to legal and financial problems. After the drop to the 4th division, a group of dedicated fans known as the "Stowarzyszenie Sympatyków Klubu GKS Katowice" (which loosely translates into Society of Well Wishers Club of GKS Katowice) took over the helm at the club. In June 2006 the club was promoted to the 3rd division, and in June 2007 the team again won promotion this time to the 2nd Division, which in 2008 was renamed the 1st Division (I Liga). The team continues to play, balancing between the I liga (2nd tier) and II liga (3rd tier).

Major achievements

National
Polish Cup titles (3): 1986, 1991, 1993
Polish Cup final: 1985, 1987, 1990, 1995, 1997
Polish Supercup titles (2): 1991, 1995
Polish Ekstraklasa Runner Up: 1988, 1989, 1992, 1994
Polish Ekstraklasa Third Team: 1987, 1990, 1995, 2003

International
Round of 16 – Cup Winners' Cup (2x) – 1986/87, 1991/92
Round of 16 – UEFA Cup (1x) – 1994/95

Youth Team
Polish U-19 Bronze Medal: 1995, 2002

GKS in Europe

Current team

Notable players 

 Jan Furtok
 Piotr Piekarczyk
 Roman Szewczyk
 Moussa Yahaya
 Andrzej Rudy
 Piotr Świerczewski
 Janusz Jojko
 Marek Koniarek
 Mirosław Kubisztal
 Marek Świerczewski
 Mirosław Sznaucner
 Sławomir Wojciechowski
 Adam Ledwoń
 Admir Adžem
 Gija Guruli
 Bartosz Karwan
 Paweł Brożek
 Kazimierz Węgrzyn
 Mirosław Widuch
 Dariusz Rzeźniczek

Managers

 Antoni Brzeżańczyk (1964–65)
 Jerzy Nikiel (1965–66)
 Tibor Kemény (1966–67)
 Tadeusz Foryś
 Augustyn Dziwisz
 Stanisław Oślizło (1979–80)
 Władysław Jan Żmuda (1980–81)
 Jerzy Nowok (1981–83)
 Jacek Góralczyk (1983)
 Zdzisław Podedworny (1984–85)
 Alojzy Łysko (1985–87)
 Władysław Jan Żmuda (1987–90)
 Orest Lenczyk (1990–91)
 Alojzy Łysko (1991–92)
 Adolf Blutsch (1992–93)
 Piotr Piekarczyk (1993–94)
 Jacek Góralczyk (1995)
 Orest Lenczyk (1995–96)
 Piotr Piekarczyk (1996–98)
 Marek Koniarek (1998–99)
 Paweł Kowalski (2000)
 Bogusław Kaczmarek (2000–01)
 Janusz Białek (2001–02)
 Jan Żurek (2002–03)
 Edward Lorens (2003)
 Jan Żurek (2003–04)
 Lechosław Olsza (2004)
 Wojciech Borecki (2004)
 Mieczysław Broniszewski (2004)
 Jan Furtok (2005)
 Lechosław Olsza (2005)
 Henryk Górnik (2005–06)
 Piotr Piekarczyk (2006–08)
 Adam Nawałka (2008–09) 
 Robert Moskal (2010) 
 Dariusz Fornalak (2010)
 Wojciech Stawowy (2010–11)
 Rafał Górak (2011–13)
 Kazimierz Moskal (2013–14)
 Artur Skowronek (2014–15) 
 Piotr Piekarczyk (2015)
 Jerzy Brzęczek (2015–17)
 Janusz Jojko (2017)  
 Piotr Mandrysz (2017–18)
 Jacek Paszulewicz (2018)
 Jakub Dziółka (2018)
 Dariusz Dudek (2018–2019)
 Rafał Górak (2019-)

See also 
 Football in Poland
 List of football teams
 Champions' Cup/League
 UEFA Cup
 Ruch Chorzów (rivalry)
 Górnik Zabrze (rivalry/friendly)
 Banik Ostrava (friendly)

References

External links
 GKS Katowice – Official website
 GKS Katowice at 90minut.pl
Official facebook
Twitter
Instagram

 
Football clubs in Katowice
Association football clubs established in 1964
1964 establishments in Poland
Organisations based in Katowice
Katowice